In Greek mythology, Acragas or Akragas (Greek: Ἀκράγας), was said to be a son of Zeus and the Oceanid Asterope, and the eponym of the town of Acragas (modern Agrigento) in Sicily.

Notes

References
 Billerbeck,  Margarethe, Stephani Byzantii Ethnica: Volumen I: Α–Γ, Walter de Gruyter, 2006. .
 Meineke, August, Stephani Byzantii Ethnicorvm quae svpersvnt, Berolini: Impensis G. Reimeri, 1849. Internet Archive.
 Smith, William; Dictionary of Greek and Roman Biography and Mythology, London (1873). "Acragas" .

Sicily
Children of Zeus